Lawrence Welk's Baby Elephant Walk and Theme from the Brothers Grimm is an album by Lawrence Welk. It was released in 1962 on the Dot label (catalog no. DLP-3457). The album debuted on Billboard magazine's popular albums chart on September 29, 1962, reached the No. 9 spot, and remained on that chart for 10 weeks

Track listing

Side 1
 "Baby Elephant Walk" (Henry Mancini) [2:12]
 "Are You Lonesome Tonight" (Roy Turk, Lou Handman) [2:25]
 "Love Me Tender" (Elvis Presley, Vera Matson) [2:18]
 "Gigi" (Alan Jay Lerner, Frederick Loewe) [2:41]
 "It's All in the Game" (Carl Sigman, Charles G. Dawes) [2:29]
 "Pretend" (Lew Douglas, Cliff Parman, Frank La Vere, Dan Belloc) [2:11

Side 2
 "Theme from the Brothers Grimm" (Bob Merrill) [2:04]
 "Three Coins in the Fountain" (Sammy Cahn, Jule Styne) [2:10]
 "Mona Lisa" (Jay Livingston, Ray Evans) [2:05]
 "It's Not For Me to Say" (Al Stillman, Robert Allen) [2:01}
 "Vaya con Dios" (Larry Russell, Inez James, Buddy Pepper) [2:22]
 "Because of You" (Arthur Hammerstein, Dudley Wilkinson) [2:23]

References

1962 albums
Dot Records albums
Lawrence Welk albums